Franz Hartmann (22 November 1838, Donauwörth – 7 August 1912, Kempten im Allgäu) was a German medical doctor, theosophist, occultist, geomancer, astrologer, and author.

Biography

Hartmann was an associate of Helena Blavatsky and was Chairman of the Board of Control of the Theosophical Society Adyar. He collaborated with the mystic Carl Kellner. He published the journals Lotusblüthen (1893-1900) and Neue Lotusblüten (1908-1913). He wrote articles on yoga and popularized the subject within Germany.

He has been described as "one of the most important theosophical writers of his time". His works include several books on esoteric studies and biographies of Jakob Böhme and Paracelsus. He translated the Bhagavad Gita into German and was the editor of the journal Lotusblüten. He was at one time a co-worker of Helena Blavatsky at Adyar. In 1896 he founded a German Theosophical Society. He also supported the Guido-von-List-Society (Guido-von-List-Gesellschaft).

According to Theodor Reuss he was one of the original founders of the magical order that would later be known as Ordo Templi Orientis, along with Reuss and Carl Kellner.

Works 

 Magic: White and Black (London, 1886)
 The Life of Jehoshua, the Prophet of Nazareth
The Principles of Astrological Geomancy
Correlation of Spiritual Forces
 With the Adepts: An Adventure Among the Rosicrucians
 Life and the Doctrines of Philippus Theophrastus Bombast of Hohenheim Known as Paracelsus (1887)
 In the Pronaos of the Temple of Wisdom Containing the History of the True and the False Rosicrucians
 Alchemy and Astrology
Metafisica Medicina y Sanacion
Philosophy and Theosophy
The Four Pillars of Occult Medicine
The Life and Doctrines of Jacob Boehme (1891)
An Adventure Among the Rosicrucians: A Student of Occultism
Among the Adepts: The Brotherhood of the Golden and Rosy Cross and Their Occult and Mysterious Powers
To Will, to Dare and to Be Silent in Magic
 Occult Science in Medicine (1893)
The Talking Image of Urur (New York, 1890)

See also 
 Christianity and Theosophy
 Theosophists as fiction writers

References

External links 
 The Life and the Doctrines of Paracelsus, by Franz Hartmann
 The Life and the Doctrines of Jacob Boehme, by Franz Hartmann
In The Pronaos of the Temple of Wisdom Containing the History of the True and the False Rosicrucians With an Introduction into the Mysteries of the Hermetic Philosophy by Franz Hartmann
Magic, White and Black or The Science of Finite and Infinite Life Containing Practical Hints for Students of Occultism by Franz Hartmann Third Edition Fourth Edition Fourth American Edition Fifth American Edition Eighth American Edition
Occult Science in Medicine by Franz Hartmann
Personal Christianity: A Science: The Doctrines of Jacob Boehme, The God-Taught Philosopher With an Introduction and Notes by Franz Hartmann
The Life of Jehoshua, the Prophet of Nazareth: An Occult Study and a Key to the Bible, Containing the History of an Initiate by Franz Hartmann
The Life of Philippus Theophrastus Bombast of Hohenheim Known by the Name of Paracelsus and The Substance of His Teachings by Franz Hartmann  
The Principles of Astrological Geomancy, The Art of Divining by Punctuation According to Cornelius Agrippa and Others by Franz Hartmann 
With the Adepts: An Adventure Among the Rosicrucians by Franz Hartmann First Edition Second Edition
Contents of Lotusblüten 1893-1900
Contents of Lotusblüten 1908-1914
Memorable Recollections from the life of the author of the "Lotusblüten".
The Life of Jehoshua, the prophet of Nazareth - full text
Digital edition of "Beitrag zur Litteratur über die Wirkung des Chloroforms" by the University and State Library Düsseldorf

1838 births
1912 deaths
German astrologers
19th-century astrologers
20th-century astrologers
German occultists
German occult writers
German Theosophists
People from Donauwörth